Zarechnaya is a station on the Avtozavodskaya line of the Nizhny Novgorod Metro. It opened on 20 November 1985 as one of the initial six station of the Metro. It was the deepest station in Nizhny Novgorod Metro from 1985 until 2012.

Location
The station is in the Leninsky district at the intersection of Prospekt Lenina and Zarechny Bulvar. The station is named for Zarechny Bulvar.

Structure
The lobby walls are decorated with unusual embossed tiles, blue and hexagonal shape, imitating waves. The station is shallow and has round white marble columns. The floor is paved with light-brown granite, symbolising river sand, and white marble. The walls are decorated with panels with pictures of the underwater world and of Nizhny Novgorod history.

See also
 List of Nizhny Novgorod metro stations

References

External links
 Station page on official Metro website

Nizhny Novgorod Metro stations
Railway stations in Russia opened in 1985
Railway stations located underground in Russia